The Hollywood Theater is a historic theater building in Minneapolis, Minnesota, United States, which is listed on the U.S. National Register of Historic Places. The Art Deco theater building opened on October 26, 1935, and the marquee proclaimed it the "Incomparable Showcase of the Northwest".  The theater, designed by architects Jack Liebenberg and Seeman Kaplan, had a generous budget that allowed for elaborate decoration in the Streamline Deco style of design; its facade and structure made a "powerful statement of geometric mass punctuated by the entrance, exits, and three small windows that served the projection booth." Liebenberg and Kaplan went on to design the Riverview Theatre in Minneapolis and the Terrace Theatre in Robbinsdale.  The building featured a tall vertical sign, a patterned terrazzo floor, gilded pillars, and acoustical tiles in geometric patterns.  It had a seating capacity of just under 1000.  Much of the interior features are influenced by the Zig-Zag Moderne and Streamline Moderne styles.  The exterior is built of smooth Kasota limestone with vertical lines that transition to horizontal.

Although the theater was praised as "the Twin Cities' most beautiful and modern neighborhood theatre" and the "incomparable showplace of the Northwest", it was not financially successful.  It went through a series of ownership changes until it closed in 1987.

The theater was designated as a local landmark by the Minneapolis Heritage Preservation Commission in 1990.  It was unable to compete with video stores and multiplexes.  Despite the historic designation, a number of development proposals for the property have fizzled since its closing.  A 1989 proposal hinted at converting the theater into fourteen apartments, and another proposal in 1989 included converting the building to a photograph and film production studio. The Minneapolis Community Development Agency bought the theater in 1993. In 1998, they considered proposals for reuse, such as a full restoration, a partial rehabilitation such as the lobby area, or completely demolishing the theater. At the time, concerns included deterioration of the brick walls and water in the basement. In 2009, the city bought an adjacent property and cleared it to provide extra space for parking or related development. In 2015, the property was sold to a developer with plans to renovate it into office space while retaining the building's historic character.

The Hollywood Theater was listed on the National Register of Historic Places on February 5, 2014.  It was considered notable for its Streamline Moderne design by prominent theater architects Liebenberg & Kaplan and its association with the growth of locally owned, streetcar-accessible neighborhood cinemas during the Great Depression.

References

External links
 Minneapolis Community Planning & Economic Development: Hollywood Theater

Buildings and structures in Minneapolis
Cinemas and movie theaters in Minnesota
National Register of Historic Places in Minneapolis
Theatres on the National Register of Historic Places in Minnesota
Theatres completed in 1935
1935 establishments in Minnesota